Vesto Melvin Slipher (November 11, 1875 – November 8, 1969) was an American astronomer who performed the first measurements of radial velocities for galaxies. He was the first to discover that distant galaxies are redshifted, thus providing the first empirical basis for the expansion of the universe. He was also the first to relate these redshifts to velocity.

Biography
Slipher was born in Mulberry, Indiana, and completed his doctorate at Indiana University in 1909.  He spent his entire career at Lowell Observatory in Flagstaff, Arizona, where he was promoted to assistant director in 1915, acting director in 1916, and finally director from 1926 until his retirement in 1952. His great grandfather helped to establish a Lutheran church.

His brother Earl C. Slipher was also an astronomer and a director at the Lowell Observatory.

Slipher used spectroscopy to investigate the rotation periods of planets and the composition of planetary atmospheres. In 1912, he was the first to observe the shift of spectral lines of galaxies, making him the discoverer of galactic redshifts. Using the Doppler effect and noting subtle changes, he measured the speeds in which spiral nebulae traveled during his research from 1912 and onward. 
These subtle changes in the speeds of the nebulae led Slipher to conclude that the nebulae were not within the Milky Way galaxy. In 1914, Slipher also made the first discovery of the rotation of spiral galaxies.
He discovered the sodium layer in 1929.  He was responsible for hiring Clyde Tombaugh and supervised the work that led to the discovery of Pluto in 1930.

By 1917, Slipher had measured the radial velocities of 25 "spiral nebulae," and found that all but three of those galaxies were moving away from us, at substantial speeds. Slipher himself speculated that this might be due to the motion of our own galaxy – as in his sample, those galaxies moving towards us and those moving away from us were roughly in opposite directions.  In hindsight, this was the first data supporting models of an expanding universe. Later, Slipher's and additional spectroscopic measurements of radial velocities were combined by Edwin Hubble with Hubble's own determinations of galaxy distances, leading Hubble to discover the (at that time, rough) proportionality between galaxies' distances and redshifts, which is today termed Hubble–Lemaître's law (formerly named as Hubble's law, the IAU Decision of October 2018 recommends the use of a new name), was formulated by Hubble and Humason in 1929 and became the basis for the modern model of the expanding universe.

Slipher died in Flagstaff, Arizona and is buried there in Citizens Cemetery.

Awards
 Member of the American Academy of Arts and Sciences (elected 1909) 
 Lalande Prize (1919)
 Gold Medal of the Paris Academy of Sciences (1919)
 Henry Draper Medal of the National Academy of Sciences (1932)
 Gold Medal of the Royal Astronomical Society (1932)
 Bruce Medal (1935)
 The crater Slipher on the Moon is named after Earl and Vesto Slipher, as is the crater Slipher on Mars and the asteroid 1766 Slipher, discovered September 7, 1962, by the Indiana Asteroid Program.

Notes

External links
 Library of Lowell Observatory: Biography of V. M. Slipher
 The Royal Observatory, Edinburgh: History, Papers & External Links on V. M. Slipher
 
 V. Slipher @ Astrophysics Data System

1875 births
1969 deaths
20th-century American astronomers
Indiana University alumni
People from Clinton County, Indiana
Recipients of the Gold Medal of the Royal Astronomical Society
People from Flagstaff, Arizona
Recipients of the Lalande Prize
Members of the United States National Academy of Sciences
Fellows of the American Academy of Arts and Sciences